Saint Andrew West Central is a parliamentary constituency represented in the House of Representatives of the Jamaican Parliament. It elects one Member of Parliament MP by the first past the post system of election.

Boundaries 

Consists of Molynes Gardens, Olympic Gardens and Seivright Gardens.

References

Parliamentary constituencies of Jamaica